Sebastiania echinocarpa is a species of flowering plant in the family Euphorbiaceae. It was described in 1874. It is native to Bahia, Brazil.

References

Plants described in 1874
Flora of Brazil
echinocarpa
Taxa named by Johannes Müller Argoviensis